The 1986 Brownlow Medal was the 59th year the award was presented to the player adjudged the fairest and best player during the Victorian Football League (VFL) home and away season. Robert DiPierdomenico of the Hawthorn Football Club and Greg Williams of the Sydney Swans both won the medal by polling seventeen votes during the 1986 VFL season.

The winning tally of 17 votes, at only 0.77 votes per game played, both set new records for the lowest in Brownlow Medal history under the 3-2-1 voting system; as of 2021, these records have not been surpassed.

Leading votegetters 
* The player was ineligible to win the medal due to suspension by the VFL Tribunal during the year.

References 

1986 in Australian rules football
1986